The 1899–1900 season was the eighth season in Liverpool F.C.'s existence, and was their seventh year in The Football League, in which they competed in the first division.

1899-1900
English football clubs 1899–1900 season